Padoan is a surname. Notable people with the surname include:

 Claudio Padoan (born 1948), Italian rower
 Loredana Padoan (1924–2016), Italian actress
 Pier Carlo Padoan (born 1950), Italian economist
  (born 1987), Italian voice actress